Mike Gabinet (born September 26, 1981) is a Canadian former professional ice hockey player and current head men's hockey ice hockey coach at the University of Nebraska at Omaha.

Playing career
Gabinet was selected by the Los Angeles Kings in the 8th round (237th overall) of the 2001 NHL Entry Draft. He played for the Nebraska-Omaha Mavericks from 2000-2004, serving as an alternate captain during his senior season. Gabinet played in 130 career games, earning six goals and 41 assists for 47 points. He currently ranks ninth all-time in scoring for UNO defensemen. Gabinet graduated with a business finance degree from UNO.

Gabinet played eight seasons of professional ice hockey in Europe and North America, including his rookie 2004–05 SM-liiga season with SaiPa.

Coaching career
He previously was an associate head coach for the men's hockey team. He was previously head coach of the men's ice hockey team at the Northern Alberta Institute of Technology located in Edmonton, Alberta. In his first season as head coach of NAIT, he led his team to the Alberta Colleges Athletic Conference Championship with a perfect 36-0 record. He was the first rookie head coach to guide his team to the conference championship since 2005-06 and he was also the first rookie head coach in Canadian college hockey history to guide his team to an undefeated season. Under Gabinet's guidance, the Ooks set an ACAC record for regular season wins (32) and overall wins (36). They were also just the third team in 51 years to go undefeated in the ACAC regular season & the ACAC playoffs. Gabinet was named the ACAC Coach of the Year in 2016.

Career statistics

Head coaching record

References

External links

1981 births
Living people
Abbotsford Heat players
Canadian expatriate ice hockey players in Finland
Canadian ice hockey coaches
Canadian ice hockey defencemen
Idaho Steelheads (ECHL) players
Iowa Stars players
Los Angeles Kings draft picks
Omaha Mavericks men's ice hockey players
Ontario Reign (ECHL) players
SaiPa players
South Carolina Stingrays players
Ice hockey people from Edmonton
Springfield Falcons players